Burning the Candle is a 1917 American silent drama film directed by Harry Beaumont and starring Henry B. Walthall, Mary Charleson and Frances Raymond.

Cast
 Henry B. Walthall as James Maxwell
 Mary Charleson as Molly Carrington
 Julien Barton as Judge Carrington
 Frances Raymond as Mrs. Carrington 
 Thurlow Brewer as Alfred Lewis
 Patrick Calhoun as Merrit Cole

References

Bibliography
 Langman, Larry. American Film Cycles: The Silent Era. Greenwood Publishing, 1998.

External links
 

1917 films
1917 drama films
1910s English-language films
American silent feature films
Silent American drama films
American black-and-white films
Films directed by Harry Beaumont
Essanay Studios films
1910s American films